Singulus Technologies AG is a German manufacturer of photovoltaic, semiconductor and optical disc manufacturing equipment. The range of use of the machines built by SINGULUS TECHNOLOGIES include physical vacuum thin-film and plasma coating, wet-chemical cleaning and etching processes as well as thermal processing technology.

References

External links

Companies based in Bavaria
Solar energy companies of Germany